Novomuraptalovo (Yañı Moraptal) is a rural locality (a selo) and the administrative centre of Muraptalovsky Selsoviet, Kuyurgazinsky District, Bashkortostan, Russia. The population was 1,289 as of 2010. There are 21 streets.

Geography 
Novomuraptalovo is located 37 km south of Yermolayevo (the district's administrative centre) by road. Staromuraptalovo is the nearest rural locality.

References 

Rural localities in Kuyurgazinsky District